Twalen is a member of the pantheon of gods and demi-gods of  Balinese mythology.

He is considered to be a clown in contemporary Balinese stories. He frequently appears in the form of a servant in wayang. However, he is older and more powerful than all the Hindu gods, being really the elder brother of Shiva (Siwa in Balinese). His cognate in Javanese tradition is Semar.

References

External links
 Bali

Balinese mythology